De Vermis Mysteriis is the sixth studio album by American heavy metal band High on Fire. Cover art was done by tattoo artist Tim Lehii.

Theme 
According to frontman Matt Pike,

The album's title (translation: "The Mysteries of the Worm,") is a nod to a fictional grimoire conceived by the late, great Psycho author Robert Bloch in 1935 and later incorporated into horror master H.P. Lovecraft's renowned Cthulhu Mythos. "It's a concept record, a little bit," Pike offers. "I got this idea about Jesus Christ and the Immaculate Conception: What if Jesus had a twin who died at birth to give Jesus his life? And then what if the twin became a time traveler right then? He lives his life only going forward until he finds this scroll from an ancient Chinese alchemist who derived a serum out of the black lotus—which is actually in Robert E. Howard's 'Conan' stories—and then he starts traveling back in time. He can see the past through his ancestors' eyes, but his enemies can kill him if they kill the ancestor that he's seeing through at the time. Basically, he keeps waking up in other people's bodies at bad times. It's kinda like that old TV show Quantum Leap. Kurt actually pointed that out to me after I told him the idea. But whatever—time travel is a killer concept."

Track listing

Personnel 
High on Fire
Matt Pike – guitars, vocals
Jeff Matz – bass
Des Kensel – drums
Additional Personnel
Kurt Ballou – producer, recording, mixing, additional guitars on "Warhorn" and "Samsara"
Paul Grosso – art direction, design
Tim Lehi – cover art and art direction
Alan Douches – mastering
Tom Couture – photography
Ashley Redshaw – additional vocals on "Spiritual Rites"

References 

2012 albums
High on Fire albums
Albums produced by Kurt Ballou